A two-lane expressway or two-lane freeway is an expressway or freeway with only one lane in each direction, and usually no median barrier. It may be built that way because of constraints, or may be intended for expansion once traffic volumes rise. The term super two is often used by roadgeeks for this type of road, but traffic engineers use that term for a high-quality surface road. Most of these roads are not tolled.

A somewhat related concept is a "four-lane undivided freeway". This is much rarer; a current example is U.S. Route 101 in California through Humboldt Redwoods State Park.

In Europe, the concept of express road encompasses roads which are classified between a motorway and an ordinary road. This concept is recognized both by European Union law and under the UNECE treaty. This type of road is not very standardized, and its geometry may vary from country to country or within a same country. These roads are usually, but not always, reserved for motorized vehicles, and accessible with limited-access roads. Some European union regulation considers the high-quality roads to be roads "which play an important role in long-distance freight and passenger traffic, integrate the main urban and economic centres, interconnect with other transport modes and link mountainous, remote, landlocked and peripheral NUTS 2 regions to central regions of the Union". According to this same regulation "High-quality roads shall be specially designed and built for motor traffic, and shall be either motorways, express roads or conventional strategic roads."

Justification
Two-lane freeways are usually built as a temporary solution due to lack of funds, as an environmental compromise or as a way to overcome problems constrained from highway reconstruction when there are four lanes or more. If the road is widened, the existing road is typically allocated to traffic going in one direction, and the lanes for the other direction are built as a whole new roadbed adjacent to the existing one. When upgraded in this manner, the road becomes a typical freeway. Many two-lane freeways are built so that when the road is upgraded to a proper divided freeway, the existing overpasses and ramps do not need reconstruction.

A super-2 expressway is a high-speed surface road with at-grade intersections, depending on the common usage of the term expressway in the area. By this definition, Super-2s can be considered the first stage of project which is expected to become a full freeway, with the transportation authority owning the land necessary for the future adjacent carriageway. At-grade intersections exist but there is sufficient land to replace them with interchanges. In some US states, a super-2 expressway is simply referred to as a super-2, regardless of whether it is fully controlled-access or not. Highway 410 in Ontario was originally a super-2 before being upgraded to a full freeway. Similarly, most of Highway 102 in Nova Scotia was a super-2 for three decades before being upgraded. Many super-2 expressways are simply just short transitional segments between surface street and four-lane divided freeways.

A super-4 expressway is a multi-lane divided highway with at-grade intersections, although the highway will become a full controlled-access freeway if the intersections are replaced with interchanges. A super-4 may have been a super-2 that has been twinned, although such instances of super-4 intermediaries are rare as super-2s are often upgraded right away to full freeways. Highway 40 in Ontario is a super-4 expressway between Highway 402 and Wellington St., and from Indian Rd to Rokeby Line. The remaining sections of Highway 40 are super-2 expressways. Other super-4 expressways include the Hanlon Parkway in Guelph and Black Creek Drive in Toronto, both which have sufficient right of way to allow for interchanges and overpasses to replace the at-grade crossings.

When a super-2 expressway is converted to a four-lane divided freeway, conversion artifacts such as double yellow lines, or broken yellow lines in passing zones are usually cleanly bestowed in favor of more consistent road marking for four-lane divided expressways.

List of two-lane freeways

Argentina
National Route 38, between Famaillá and Juan Bautista Alberdi in Tucumán Province.

Australia

 In Melbourne, Victoria, the Mornington Peninsula Freeway, is a two-lane freeway between the interchange with Jetty Road and the interchange with Boneo Road at 90 km/h.
 In Brisbane, Queensland, the Cunningham Highway, is a two-lane freeway between Warwick Road and Ripley Road, After Ripley Road the Cunningham Highway is grade separated until it meets the Ipswich Motorway, M2.
 In Hobart, Tasmania; Kingston Bypass has been constructed as a two-lane expressway, with provision for dual carriageway in the future when needed.
 In north-eastern Tasmania, the Bass Highway has some grade-separated interchanges, and the standard rural freeway 110 km/h speed limit, but with some sections having only two lanes.
 On the Sunshine Coast in Queensland, the Sunshine Motorway is a two-lane freeway between Kawana Way and Nicklin Way, and again between David Low Way and Emu Mountain Road (although it has a roundabout in this section).
 In Townsville, Queensland, the future Townsville Ring Road is planned to be the future route of Highway 1 through the city. The first stage of the project, the two-laned Douglas Arterial Road opened in April 2005. Once all four stages are built, it will have two lanes in each direction, and be designated as the M1.
 Canberra's Gungahlin Drive Extension (GDE) was constructed as a two-lane grade-separated freeway for part of its length. The GDE has since been duplicated to four lanes.
 The "Motorway Link Road", between the Pacific Highway and the Pacific Motorway on the Central Coast of New South Wales, is also another example of a two-way freeway—it has a speed limit of 100 km/h.
 Mandjoogoordap Drive in Mandurah, Western Australia, was to be built as a two-lane freeway, before funding was then supplied for duplication.

Canada
Many of the 100-series highways in Nova Scotia and arterial highways in New Brunswick are two-lane freeways, with diamond interchanges and grade separations with many intersecting roads.
Some Quebec Autoroutes are also two-lane freeways for some of their length, including Autoroute 50 in Mirabel and Autoroute 20 in Rimouski.
Some sections of the Trans Canada Highway in Newfoundland, Nova Scotia, Ontario, Manitoba, and British Columbia are two-lane freeways.
 Airport Parkway located in Ottawa connects the Ottawa Macdonald–Cartier International Airport to downtown. Its speed limit is 80 km/h with no mid line dividers. Talks have suggested to twin the expressway.
 In Ottawa, the transit-ways are almost entirely two lane, undivided freeways through the use of grade separations but are for buses and emergency vehicles only.

Europe

 In a few European countries (like Germany and Switzerland), many rural highways have been converted into two-lane freeways. However, most of these have been built with low overpasses wide enough to accommodate only two-lanes, which indicates that there is no intent to widen them into freeways in the foreseeable future. In German this type of road is called an Autostrasse.
 In Germany rural segments of the A 8 in the Saarland (between Saarlouis and the Luxembourg border), the A 60 from the exit for Prüm to the Belgian border, and the A 62 between the A 6 and the A 8, are two lanes (or, in the former two cases, 2 + 1 with an extra climbing lane). Unlike the Autostrassen previously mentioned, these segments are built to Autobahn standards but with only one carriageway; all of the overpasses, culverts and short bridges, cuttings and earthworks are wide enough for twin carriageways, and only some long bridges would need to be dualized for upgrading to a full 4- or 5-lane Autobahn.
 In Croatia, the Istrian Y highway complex used to consist out of two-lane freeways, which were due to be upgraded to four-lane ones, should the traffic increase. However, as the traffic increases came sooner than it was predicted, the status of Istrian Y was changed to semi-highway, as a widening to four or six lanes is already in progress.
 Highway 19 in the Czech Republic is a two-lane expressway between Highway 3 and Zahradka.
 Some of the motorways in former German areas in Poland were originally two-lane expressways when built in the 1930s. Currently the road from Elbląg to Kaliningrad in Russia is still two-lane and in Poland is signed as expressway S22.
 In Sweden and Norway, a large amount of two-lane expressways were built in the period 1960-1990 (Sweden) and 1970-2000 (Norway). In addition, some have been built in Denmark. Only a few such roads have been built recently because there were many serious accidents. Many have been widened to four-lane expressways. Those remaining have, in Sweden, been converted to 2+1 roads with a barrier between the directions. In Norway and many other European countries the two-lane expressways are too narrow to convert to 2+1-road if they are not widened.
 In Spain, there were few two-lane expressways until the 1980s, when many started being built to provide a faster and safer alternative to old rural roads that cross towns and have long and dangerous tracings around mountains and other obstacles. Although there are less accidents on this type of road than in normal roads, those that happen are usually more serious, due to the high speeds they allow (100 km/h, but up to 120 km/h to pass). Some blamed the name "expressway" as being an "apology of speed", so after 2003 it was changed for "automobile way" in most of the country ("high performance way" in some regions). Since the 1990s, many have been widened to four-lane or six-lane expressways, but still few have been converted to 2+1 roads. In 2019, their general speed limit was lowered to 90 km/h.
 In Romania the total width of an expressway is 21.5 m, while the width of a highway is 26 m. As a result, each lane of an expressway are 0.25 meters narrower and there are no emergency lanes. The maximum speed is 10 km/h lower than that of a highway, 120km/h instead of 130km/h.

Japan

While most expressways in Japan are four-lane divided expressways with median barriers, some expressways in rural areas are two-lane expressways, such as some sections of the Hokkaidō Expressway. The two-lane expressways in Japan are built in the same manner as the ordinary four-lane expressways with grade-separated interchanges and full access control, allowing future conversions to full four-lane divided expressways.

Malaysia

The two-lane expressway is not a new concept in Malaysia, as the Kuala Lumpur–Karak Expressway was initially a two-lane toll expressway before being upgraded to a full expressway in 1997. While the full four-lane divided toll expressways are more favored in recent years due to their higher traffic capacity, a few two-lane expressways do exist, such as the Kempas Highway and the North Klang Straits Bypass. These expressways, however, only have partial access control with at-grade intersections commonly available like most other federal and state roads. Nevertheless, these two-lane highways are still classified as "two-lane expressways" as they are maintained by highway concessionaires, namely PLUS Expressways Berhad (Kempas Highway) and Shapadu (North Klang Straits Bypass).
Meanwhile, the South Klang Valley Expressway at Teluk Panglima Garang is a two-lane carriageway making it the first true two-lane expressway in Klang Valley and the second in Malaysia.

The first true two-lane expressway with full access control is the section of the Senai–Desaru Expressway between Cahaya Baru and Penawar.

Mexico
A new Super-2 bypass of Mexicali (MEX-2D) was completed in summer 2006. It features 1 lane in each direction and is a toll road. Three interchanges exist—one at each end, and one in the middle, providing access to MEX-5 (north to downtown Mexicali and south to San Felipe). The road has complete control of access. According to a toll collector, this Super-2 is scheduled for an upgrade to a full toll freeway (four lanes, two in each direction) by sometime in 2008. Eventually, this freeway may be constructed all the way to San Luis Río Colorado, replacing the existing four lane undivided highway, MEX-2.
A Super-2 toll road, MEX-150D and MEX-190D (MEX-150D travels to Veracruz), connects Mexico City and Oaxaca.
A Super-2 bypass of Poza Rica, Veracruz, was finished in 2005. This two-lane toll highway connects MEX 131 north of Poza Rica to MEX 180 east of Papantla.
A Super-2 toll road (MEX-15D) connects most of the distance between Mazatlán and Tepic.

New Zealand
Motorways
 The Wellington Urban Motorway is three lanes undivided (two northbound, one southbound) through the Terrace Motorway Tunnel. A separate southbound tunnel was never built.
 Christchurch
The Christchurch Northern Motorway is two lanes undivided between its northern terminus at Pineacres and the Lineside Road interchange. This reduces the number of lanes prior to the northern terminus, where the motorway merges onto a two-laned road.
 In the southwestern part of the city prior to 2012 was the two-laned Christchurch Southern Motorway, between Barrington Street and Curletts Road. The road has since been duplicated to four lanes divided as part of the motorway's extension from Curletts Road to Halswell Junction Road.

 Expressways
 Linking the cities of Napier and Hastings is the two-laned Hawke's Bay Expressway.
 Linking Christchurch with Lyttelton is the limited-access Tunnel Road.
 In Dunedin, the Dunedin Southern Motorway has a short one-kilometre section which is only two-laned. Work is underway to widen it to duplicate the road to four lanes divided.

Philippines

A segment of Metro Manila Skyway from Alabang South Station to Alabang Toll Plaza is a two-lane expressway.
A segment of North Luzon Expressway in Mabalacat, Pampanga from Subic–Clark–Tarlac Expressway (SCTEX) Interchange to Santa Ines (northern terminus) was a two-lane expressway. However, it was announced on 7 November 2013 that the Manila North Tollways Corporation will expand SCTEX-Santa Ines segment from two lanes to four lanes.
A segment of the Southern Tagalog Arterial Road (STAR Tollway) from Lipa to Batangas City (southern terminus) was a two-lane expressway but upgraded into a four-lane expressway, however the segment of Sabang Bridge to the Batangas Toll Plaza of the expressway is still a two-lane expressway.
The Subic Freeport Expressway in the provinces of Zambales and Bataan was a two-lane expressway until its expansion in 2020.

South Africa
Some sections of two-lane freeway can be found on the N1 and the N2 highways.

United Kingdom
The former A6144(M) in Manchester had one lane in each direction, although to motorway standards. It has now been downgraded to an A road.
Part of the A601(M) road in Lancashire was a two-lane motorway between its junction with the M6 and terminus at the B6254. This section was downgraded to a B road in 2020.
The Runcorn Spur Road in Runcorn is a two-lane expressway with grade separations and at-grade intersections (partially motorway-like).

United States

Arizona

A portion of State Route 80 in the vicinity of Bisbee is a two-lane expressway with an interchange at West Boulevard and Tombstone Canyon Road (Historic US 80).

California
U.S. Highway 101 is a two-lane undivided freeway between County Route D8 near the Klamath River and Elhers Avenue in Klamath. US 101 is also a two-lane undivided freeway for most of the segment bypassing Willits.
State Route 108 bypassing Sonora is a two-lane undivided freeway.
A section of State Route 138 at Cleghorn Road in San Bernardino County briefly becomes a two-lane freeway.
State Route 154 is a two-lane undivided freeway over State Route 192 in Santa Barbara.
State Route 255 is a two-lane undivided freeway for the Samoa Bridge segment between Eureka and Samoa, with one interchange at Woodley Island in Eureka.
U.S. Highway 395 in Inyokern is a two-lane freeway east of Inyokern Airport.

Connecticut

A  portion of the Milford Connector from the Wilbur Cross Parkway to Wheelers Farms Road in Milford. This divided two-lane extension of the original connector opened in 1993.
Route 190 between Route 159 in Suffield and the Pearl Street underpass in Enfield is a two-lane undivided freeway. It was originally planned to be a four-lane expressway across northern Connecticut.
Route 2A from the eastbound on-ramp from Mohegan Boulevard to Route 12.

Florida

State Road 293 is a two-lane expressway on two separate locations. One is north of the unincorporated community of Bluewater Bay, and the other section is north of Niceville. This parkway mostly serves as bypass around the community of Niceville, providing quicker access to Bluewater Bay and Destin. 
State Road 407, providing a connection between the Beachline Expressway, Interstate 95, and State Road 405 for direct access into Kennedy Space Center, is a two-lane freeway for most of its distance. An at-grade intersection is near its eastern terminus.
State Road 570 (Polk Parkway) was a two-lane freeway along its northernmost  from its opening in 1999 to 2011. This is an example of a two-lane toll road.

Kansas

U.S. Highway 36 from just west of Hiawatha to Wathena.
U.S. Highway 400 bypasses Neodesha to the south and west. The western portion of this bypass is two-lane, while the eastern section, overlapping U.S. Highway 75 is a conventional four-lane freeway.
K-96/K-14 bypasses Hutchinson from the south at U.S. Highway 50 along the western side of the urban area to just northwest of Yaggy at West 50th Avenue, where it returns to a conventional two-lane highway.
K-10 from its western terminus at Interstate 70 (Kansas Turnpike) to U.S. Highway 59 is a super-2.
K-4 from U.S. Highway 40 at SE 6th Street to U.S. Highway 24 is a super-2 and is known to residents of Topeka as the Oakland Expressway.
U.S. Highway 75 runs as a super-2 from its junction with Interstate 35/U.S. Highway 50 at BETO Junction to K-31 at Melvern Lake.
U.S. Highway 169 runs as a super-2 from its junction with U.S. Highway 54 in Iola, Kansas to Fourty-Ninth St in Chanute, Kansas

Kentucky

The Hal Rogers Parkway (formerly Daniel Boone Parkway), connecting Hazard and London, is a two-lane freeway for virtually its entire length (approximately ), with occasional truck lanes on hills. The only four-lane section is the northern bypass of London at the road's western end. Originally, the road was tolled from the eastern end of the London bypass to Hazard. Upgrading to four lanes had been considered in the early 21st century as part of a possible extension to Interstate 66, but I-66 was officially killed in 2015.
The Bert T. Combs Mountain Parkway, another road that was originally a toll road but has since ceased toll collection, is a two-lane freeway from exit 46 at Campton to the road's eastern terminus in Salyersville. In 2014, Kentucky Governor Steve Beshear announced a proposal to upgrade the two-lane section to four lanes, and extend the parkway a further  to Prestonsburg.

Louisiana

Louisiana Highway 1, the completed elevated section is a two-lane toll bridge from Leeville crossing Bayou Lafourche to Port Fourchon with future phases to eventually convert the highway from Port Fourchon to Golden Meadow into a four-lane elevated expressway.

Maine

Interstate 95 north of Bangor was originally constructed as a two-lane freeway. In 1981 the present divided highway was completed between Bangor and Houlton at the Canadian border.

Maryland

Maryland Route 90 (Ocean City Expressway) is mostly a two-lane freeway (it has one traffic light).
Portions of the Francis Scott Key Bridge approach (exit 42 to exit 44) on the Baltimore Beltway were originally a two-lane freeway when the final section of the beltway opened in 1977. The highway was updated to four lanes in the mid-1990s.
The Hampstead Bypass (Maryland Route 30) in Carroll County is a two-lane freeway. It has one at-grade intersection with Maryland Route 482.
The Bel Air Bypass (U.S. Route 1) in Harford County includes portions of two-lane freeway along with 2+2 road segments.

Massachusetts

U.S. Route 6 on Cape Cod, from exit 9 (Route 134) in Dennis to the Orleans Rotary. This stretch of highway is known to locals as "Suicide Alley" due to the high number of fatalities from head-on collisions. Median construction has alleviated this problem somewhat.
Route 2, from Erving to the eastern U.S. Route 202 interchange in Phillipston.
Plimoth Plantation Highway, a spur off Route 3 in Plymouth.
U.S. Route 44 from Route 105 in Middleborough to Route 58 in Carver. This stretch of highway has a guard rail that acts as a median barrier.
Route 88, a two-lane highway in Westport connecting Interstate 195, US 6, and Route 177 to Horseneck Beach. Unlike the other examples in Massachusetts, Route 88 features a mixture of interchanges and signaled intersections.
Route 107’s northernmost segment is a two lane expressway known as the Bridge Street Bypass, which circumvents the downtown Salem area to the west.

Michigan

A rare instance of a two-lane freeway that was restricted to only one direction of traffic existed in Michigan at one time, of which U.S. Highway 16 was restricted to eastbound traffic when bypassing Farmington, Michigan. This rare instance permitted passing traffic without the liability of a head-on collision, though this changed when it was upgraded to a four-lane divided freeway which became I-96, and later M-102, then M-5.
M-231 is a two-lane freeway built as a “U.S. 31 emergency Route” between Interstate 96 and M-104 to M-45 with one at grade intersection at Lincoln St near Robinson. Future plans call for southward extensions and widening of M-231

Minnesota

U.S. Highway 12 bypasses around Long Lake, from Wayzata to Orono. Originally built without a median, a median was installed in September 2016 in response to the highway's high accident rate.

Missouri

U.S. Route 54 bypasses Mexico, on a two-lane expressway around the city. The two-lane expressway both begins and ends at the original route through Mexico, now signed as Business Loop 54. The divided highway begins just east of the West Mexico Interchange, while the east end is only a set of ramps to eventually be connected to the planned expressway. Another two-lane freeway section is a north bypass of Bowling Green with a grade separated crossing at Business US Route 61 and a diamond interchange at U.S. Route 61 (intersections are on 54) that has grading for a full cloverleaf interchange.

U.S. Route 65 in Warsaw, is a two-lane expressway from Route MM to just north of Main Street. The portion from north of Main Street to North Dam Access Road become a four-lane expressway in 2012.

Montana 

 Interstate 15 and Interstate 90 in Butte, Montana has 2 separate two-lane expressways in opposite directions.

New Hampshire

 Interstate 93 (Franconia Notch Parkway) from Lincoln (mile marker 113) to Franconia (mile marker 121), due to fears that building a four-lane highway would destabilize the Old Man of the Mountain, long before the rock formation's natural collapse from erosion occurred on 3 May 2003. The highway was constructed with a median divider. This segment of I-93 is now the only Interstate highway with fewer than four lanes.
Laconia Bypass (U.S. Route 3 and New Hampshire Route 11)
New Hampshire Route 101 from Milford to Amherst and again from exit 13 (New Hampshire Route 27) in Hampton to Highland Avenue at Hampton Beach. A former two-lane freeway section from Raymond to Hampton was widened to four lanes in the mid 1990s.
Spaulding Turnpike from Rochester to Milton
New Hampshire Route 9 and U.S. Route 202 overlap from Henniker to Hillsborough
U.S. Route 4 from Sheep Road in Lee to the New Hampshire Route 108 exit in Durham bypasses the University of New Hampshire.

New Jersey

The Freehold Bypass of Route 33 is a two-lane freeway between Halls Mill Road (County Route 55) and Brickyard Road. There is a full cloverleaf at Halls Mill, a westbound entrance at Howell Road, and full access from Fairfield Road.

New York

An example of a two-lane parkway is Bethpage State Parkway on Long Island. This was constructed by Robert Moses as a two-lane freeway in part due to aesthetics. Like most parkways (especially those created by Moses), the road was originally meant to deliver a pleasurable motoring experience, and as such incorporates natural scenery, as well as pedestrian and bicycle trails for those who choose not to drive.
New York State Route 104 has two-lane freeway sections between Rochester and Oswego. It was originally intended to become a freeway, but only one set of lanes were built.
This section, colloquially known as the Slingerlands Bypass, was originally constructed as two lanes of a four-lane expressway when it was designed in the 1940s and 1950s. However, the remaining two lanes were never completed. In the future, the unused portions of adjacent land could easily be used to construct the two lanes originally planned, with minimal effort, if necessary. This is due to the fact that most of the grading and drainage is already present from the original construction work.
New York State Route 5S has a two-lane freeway section between Ilion and its junction with New York State Route 28. The highway is a divided four-lane freeway west of this, extending to Utica.

North Carolina

 U.S. Highway 1 between Cary and Sanford (exits 70 and 98) was a two-lane freeway until its expansion to four divided lanes in the late 1990s.
 U.S. Highway 17 between exits 224 and 229 in the Edenton area was a two-lane freeway until the late 1990s.
 U.S. Highway 64 between exits 457 and 463 in the Nashville area was a two-lane freeway until the late 70s.
 U.S. Highway 421 was originally constructed with three two-lane freeway segments—the first between Winston-Salem and Yadkinville, with the second sections as part of a bypass around the towns of North Wilkesboro and Wilkesboro. These sections were converted into four-lane divided freeways between the 1970s and 1990s.

Ohio

U.S. Route 33, from Athens to Darwin, and again between State Route 7 and Ravenswood, West Virginia
In the Delaware urban area, U.S. Route 42 is a two-lane freeway between London Road and U.S. Route 23, it has some grade-separations. Incidentally its intersection with U.S. Route 23, with which it runs concurrent, is at-grade.
U.S. Route 22 is a two-lane expressway between Cadiz and Hopedale for 2.5 miles between two four-lane divided segments.

Oklahoma

Chickasaw Turnpike

Oregon

U.S. Route 97 is a 2 and 3 lane undivided freeway bypass of Wasco. Also parts of the Klamath Falls bypass are 2 lane undivided freeway.
U.S. Route 101, from the southern edge of Cannon Beach north to the interchange with U.S. Route 26 south of Seaside.
Oregon Route 22 is a four-lane divided freeway from Salem east to just north of Aumsville. It becomes a true freeway for about  through Stayton/Sublimity, then is a two-lane freeway for about another mile east. (The freeway section between Aumsville and Stayton used to be a two-lane freeway.)

Pennsylvania

U.S. Route 220, south of the Bedford Fairgrounds interchange to the intersection with Business Route 220.
Route 8, just north of the Interstate 80 interchange in Barkeyville, for 1.4 miles before it upgrades to a four-lane divided highway.

Rhode Island

Route 78, which starts about  inside Connecticut bypasses the city of Westerly to the north and east, and is a key route for traffic heading between Interstate 95 and the Rhode Island beaches.
Route 138 was originally a two-lane freeway between U.S. Route 1 and the Jamestown Bridge, but was widened to four-lanes following the opening of the Jamestown-Verrazano Bridge in 1992.

Texas

State Highway 99 (Grand Parkway) in Liberty and Chambers Counties (consisting of Segments H and I-1) is a two-lane toll road.
A section of State Highway 105 south of Cleveland is a two-lane freeway.
State Highway 249 (Aggie Expressway) within Grimes County is a non-tolled two-lane freeway.
Most of Loop 322 in Abilene was once a two-lane freeway; however, it was later upgraded to a conventional divided highway.
Loop 49 in Tyler is a two-lane tollway.
U.S. Highway 82 is a two-lane expressway between Bonham and its merger with State Highway 56 at Honey Grove.
U.S. Highway 287 was a two-lane expressway between Interstate 45 and Business U.S. Highway 287 (Ennis Avenue) near Ennis, however, it was recently upgraded to a 4 lane divided highway with frontage roads.
The Chisholm Trail Parkway in Johnson County is a two-lane tollway with intermittent passing lanes.
As of January 2018, the proposed Cibolo Parkway in Cibolo will initially be built as a two-lane tollway.

Utah
 Utah State Route 7 is routed around St. George on a two-lane freeway bypass and will be fully-upgraded to a divided freeway when demand is met.
 U.S. Route 6 / U.S. Route 191 is routed around Price on a two-lane freeway bypass.

Vermont

 U.S. Route 7 just north of Bennington to just north of Manchester is a full expressway that turns into a two-lane freeway just after exit 2. There are two more exits on this section of U.S. Route 7. Exit 3 serves Vermont Route 7A in the Arlington area, and exit 4 serves Vermont Route 30 and Vermont Route 11 for Manchester.
 Vermont Route 289 around Burlington. Plans to extend the Super 2 both north and south were cancelled by Vermont Governor Peter Shumlin in May 2011. Mile markers on the constructed segment are based on the entire length as originally planned.
The Bennington Bypass is a two-lane bypass (half beltway) of Bennington. Two segments, from New York Route 7 to U.S. Route 7 and from U.S. Route 7 to Vermont Route 9 are open and signed as Vermont Route 279. The remaining southern portion of the bypass remains to be built and is unfunded.
 A short section of Vermont Route 127 in Burlington known as the Winooski Valley Parkway is built as a two-lane expressway.

Virginia
The Staunton Loop Road (State Route 262) is a two-lane freeway for most of its length. Grading already exists for this highway to be upgraded to a fully divided highway in the future.
 U.S. Route 501 in Lynchburg has a short two-lane expressway segment.
 State Route 10 and U.S. Route 258 where they bypass Smithfield.

Washington

U.S. Route 2 between Bickford Road and 92nd St S.E. around Snohomish.
U.S. Route 101 from the interchange with State Route 3 to the northern city limits of Shelton (half-freeway with two-way traffic on northbound side and no plans for the southbound half being constructed) and a section between Sequim and Port Angeles (half-freeway with two-way traffic on the eastbound side, with some intersection segments upgraded to full freeway and plans for further improvements).
U.S. Route 195 has two lane expressway segments between Spangle and Plaza, and on the Thornton bypass. The Plaza bypass is a two lane freeway.
Washington State Route 9 has a two lane expressway from Marsh Road in Snohomish to Arlington with the exception of a 2 mile 4 lane divided section through Lake Stevens with plans for more 4 laning between Snohomish and Lake Stevens.
State Route 522 after the at-grade intersection with State Route 524 to the Snohomish River near Monroe.

West Virginia

The West Virginia Turnpike was a two-lane freeway from its opening in 1954 until it was expanded to four lanes in 1986.

US 52 from Ohio State Route 7 to Interstate 64.

Wisconsin

US 14, south of the interchange with County Trunk Highway MM at Oregon, to Wisconsin Highway 138 (WIS 138). This section was expanded to four lanes during the middle of 2009.
A segment of WSI 26 bypassing Fort Atkinson was built as a two-lane limited access freeway. This section was expanded to four lanes during the middle of 2011.
US 45, from its split from US 41 (now I-41) north of Milwaukee to a point just north of West Bend, Wisconsin, was built as a two-lane freeway, then expanded to four lanes in 1990.
The US 151 bypasses of Beaver Dam and Waupun were originally built as Super 2s during the 1970s to accommodate future expansion; these have since been upgraded as part of the highway's ongoing conversion to a four-lane facility through the entire state.
Portions of I-39/US 51, first near Westfield and later near Tomahawk, were built as a two-lane freeways; these were expanded in the late 1980s and 1990s respectively. While I-39 ends in Wausau, a portion of US 51 north of Tomahawk remains a Super 2, with a stub allowing for future expansion to four lanes north of the US 8 interchange.
WIS 35/WIS 65 on the River Falls Bypass from WIS 29 to when the four-lane starts.

Vietnam

The section from Yen Bai City to Lao Cai City of the Hanoi-Lao Cai Expressway is two-laned.

The section between Cam Lo and Hoa Lien of the North-South expressway is two-laned.

See also
2+1 road
Super 2

References

 
Types of roads